Line 10 of the Chengdu Metro runs from Taipingyuan in Wuhou to Xinping in Xinjin. In 2024, the line will be 43.9 km long with the 5.9 km northeastern extension (Phase 3) to People's Park.

Phase I of Line 10 began construction in July 2014 and opened in September 2017. Phase II began construction in 2016 and opened on December 27, 2019.
It is the first line in Chengdu Metro to use 6-car Type A rolling stock for service.

Line 10's color is sky blue.

Opening timeline

Stations

References

Chengdu Metro lines
Railway lines opened in 2017
2017 establishments in China
Airport rail links in China